A special election was held for the  after William Prince (DR-Jackson) died on September 8, 1824.

Consequently, a special election was held to fill the vacancy.

Election results

Call took his seat on December 23, 1824, serving until the end of the 18th Congress on March 13, 1825.

See also
List of special elections to the United States House of Representatives

References

1st congressional district special election
Indiana 01
1824 01
Indiana 1824 01
Indiana 1824 01
United States House of Representatives 1824 01